Boreray may refer to:

An island in the Outer Hebrides of Scotland:

Boreray, North Uist
Boreray, St Kilda

A domesticated animal:
Boreray sheep